The American Board of Legal Medicine sets the standards for training and certifying competency in health care law for dual degreed physician attorneys, with the self-stated aim of promoting excellence in practice through its certification process. Candidates who have completed the requisite training may take an examination to become board-certified by ABLM.

History

The current American Board of Legal Medicine is a nonprofit organization incorporated in 1951 in the state of Delaware. In 1980, the American Board of Law in Medicine, Inc. also was incorporated in the state of Delaware. To facilitate the recognition of Legal Medicine as a specialty, the two entities merged in 1987 with the surviving entity being the American Board of Legal Medicine, Inc. In 2007, the subsidiary American Board of Medical Malpractice was developed to certify professionals who hold a law degree plus a doctoral level health care degree other than M.D. or D.O.

Organization
The ABLM is governed by a twelve-member board, who elect their own chairman, secretary, and treasurer.

Examination process
ABLM administers examinations to individuals with both legal and medical degrees. The Board has certified approximately 300 MD/JDs in legal medicine by means of computer-based or paper based examinations. The ABLM also furnishes study materials and courses in Legal Medicine and Medical Malpractice.

Board members
Peter Rheinstein
Cyril Wecht
Marvin Firestone
John K. Hall
Curtis E. Harris
Weldon E. Havins
Matthias Okoye 
Daniel L. Orr II
Michael M. Raskin
Shafeek Sandy Sanbar
Richard Wilbur

References

Medical associations based in the United States
Non-profit organizations based in Delaware
Medical and health organizations based in Maryland
Medical jurisprudence